Ornithine decarboxylase antizyme is an enzyme that in humans is encoded by the OAZ1 gene.

Ornithine decarboxylase catalyzes the conversion of ornithine to putrescine in the first and apparently rate-limiting step in polyamine biosynthesis. The ornithine decarboxylase antizymes play a role in the regulation of polyamine synthesis by binding to and inhibiting ornithine decarboxylase. Antizyme expression is auto-regulated by polyamine-enhanced translational frameshifting. The antizyme encoded by this gene inhibits ornithine decarboxylase and accelerates its degradation.

References

Further reading